Albin Novšak (born 9 February 1915, date of death unknown) was a Slovenian ski jumper. He competed in the individual event at the 1936 Winter Olympics.

References

1915 births
Year of death missing
Slovenian male ski jumpers
Olympic ski jumpers of Yugoslavia
Ski jumpers at the 1936 Winter Olympics
People from the Municipality of Bohinj